Maria-Magdalena Zaharescu (born 1938) is a Romanian chemist, specializing in the physical chemistry of oxide systems.

Dr. Zaharescu was a Senior Researcher and Head of Department at the “Ilie Murgulescu” Institute of Physical Chemistry of the Romanian Academy in Bucharest. In 2001, she was elected a corresponding member of the Romanian Academy and became a full member in June 2015. On December 1, 2017, she was awarded a Knight of the Order of the Star of Romania.

She was one of the 100 women scientists featured in "Successful Women Ceramic and Glass Scientists and Engineers: 100 Inspirational Profiles"   by Lynnette Madsen (2016).

Scientific Interests 

Her scientific interests include:

 Physical chemistry of oxide systems (reactions mechanisms, thermal phase equilibria, structure-properties correlations).
 Sol-gel science (sol-gel chemistry, nanostructured oxide films and powders, inorganic-organic hybrids, nanocomposites, oxide nanotubes). She introduced and developed the field of sol-gel research in Romania.
 Vitreous oxide systems with special properties (thermally and chemically stable)

Education 

graduated from the Babeș-Bolyai University, Faculty of Chemistry, Cluj-Napoca, Romania
received her PhD from the Institute of Chemistry, Cluj-Napoca, Romania

Scientific Activity 

 More than 350 scientific papers from which over 250 published in internationally recognized ISI journals, including J. Sol-Gel Sci. Technol.; J. Eur. Ceram. Soc.; J. Am. Ceram. Soc.; J. Mater. Chem.; J. Mater. Sci.; J. Mater. Res.; Mater. Chem. Phys.; J. Non-Cryst. Solids; J. Therm. Anal. Calorim.; Appl. Surf. Sci.; J. Nanopart. Res.; Ceram. Int.; Thin Solid Films; Rev. Roum. Chim., etc. as well as 3 patents and 8 book chapters edited by the Romanian Academy and international publishers.
 International research projects in collaboration with Davis University, USA (funded by NST-USA), National Technical University of Athens,  Greece (funded by NATO) and universities from Czech Republic, Bulgaria, France, Slovenia
 Member of the International Society of Sol-Gel Science
 Member of the American Ceramic Society – Basic Research Division
 Member of the American Nano Society
 Member of the editorial board of the Journal of Sol-Gel Science and Technology.

Books 

In 2016, Dr. Zaharescu published 1D Oxide Nanostructures Obtained by Sol-Gel and Hydrothermal Methods, as part of the SpringerBriefs series offered by the Springer Publishing Company.

Awards 

1971 - Gheorghe Spacu Award, Romanian Academy
1982 - Scientific Merit Medal, Romania
1983 - Scientific Order Third Degree, Romania
2007 - Honor Award and Gheorghe Spacu Medal, Romanian Society of Chemistry
2017 - Knight of the Order of the Star of Romania

Notes

External links

List of members of the Romanian Academy

Living people
1938 births
Romanian chemists
Romanian women chemists
Corresponding members of the Romanian Academy